Narayan Dutta Mishra  is a Nepali politician belonging to Nepali Congress. He is also member of Rastriya Sabha and was elected under open category.

References 

Living people
Nepali Congress politicians from Sudurpashchim Province
21st-century Nepalese politicians
Year of birth missing (living people)
Members of the National Assembly (Nepal)